Qoşabulaq or Koshabulak may refer to:
 Qoşabulaq, Gadabay, Azerbaijan
 Qoşabulaq, Jabrayil, Azerbaijan